The WorldFest-Houston International Film Festival, founded in 1968, is an annual film festival held annually in April in Houston, Texas. Notable festival alumni include John Lee Hancock, who wrote and directed the Oscar-winning film The Blind Side, as well as Steven Spielberg, Randal Kleiser, Ang Lee and David Winning.

Competition categories 
WorldFest bestows awards in 10 major film and video categories as well as 200+ sub-categories.
 Independent Shorts
 Independent Experimental Films & Videos
 Independent Theatrical Features
 Independent Study Films & Videos
 Television and Cable Production
 TV Commercials / Public Service Announcements
 Film & Video Production
 Screenplays
 Music Videos
 New Media (including websites and 3D productions)

Awards
The award given at the Worldfest-Houston is called the Remi. The Remi Award is named after painter/illustrator Frederic Remington.

One Grand Remi is awarded to the top winner in each of the major competition categories.
 Grand Remi

Within each competition category, there are multiple sub-categories. The following are awarded in each sub-categories:
 Platinum Remi
 Gold Remi
 Silver Remi
 Bronze Remi
 Special Jury Award

References

External links 
 Official website

Film festivals in Houston
Film festivals established in 1968
1968 establishments in Texas
April events